The Oklahoma state elections were held on November 2, 2004. The primary election was held on July 27. The runoff primary election was held August 24.

Overview

Executive Branch Before Election

Legislature Before Election

Executive Branch After Election

Legislature After Election

Primary election
The candidates for the parties faced on in the primary election on July 25. If no party received more than 50% of the vote, a runoff election was held on August 22 to decide the winner.

Candidates

Corporation Commissioner

U.S. Representatives

State Questions

See also
Government of Oklahoma
Oklahoma House of Representatives
Oklahoma Senate
Politics of Oklahoma
Oklahoma Congressional Districts

References

External links
Oklahoma State Election Board

 
Oklahoma